Metrorrey, officially Sistema de Transporte Colectivo Metrorrey, is a rapid transit system in Monterrey, Nuevo León, Mexico. Operations began in 1991.

Operations

Lines 

The Metrorrey has three lines with 40 stations.

Line 1 opened on April 25 of 1991 and has 19 stations, it runs through the center of the city from the north-west to the eastern part of the Monterrey metropolitan area. A complete ride along this line takes about 27 minutes.

In 2005 construction began on an expansion to the line with a total investment of US$200 million. Said expansion comprised 2 phases, the first one being  ( of it underground) long, it opened on October 31 of 2007 adding 3 more stations to the line. The second phase added another  of elevated railway along the center of the Universidad avenue and 4 more stations, it was inaugurated on October 9 of 2008 by Nuevo León Governor Natividad González Parás and Mexican president Felipe Calderón.

The two lines are operated jointly.
Construction of Line 3 started in 2013 and was completed by January 2020, but the rolling stock had not been delivered; at that time, the estimated delivery for twenty-six rail cars was December 2020. It was eventually inaugurated on February 27, 2021 by Nuevo León Governor Jaime Rodríguez Calderón.

Ridership 
According to Mexico's National Institute of Statistics, Geography and Informatics, Metrorrey's two lines transported 180.8 million passengers in 2018, which corresponds to an average daily ridership of 495,000 passengers.

Fares 
The following are the travel fares :

Single Trip - MXN4.50 (~USD0.22)
2 Trips - MXN8.00 (~USD0.39)
Metrobus - From bus to Metro: Cash: MXN12.00 (~USD0.64), with "Feria" card: MXN11.79 (~USD0.62), From Metro to bus: MXN8.00 (~ USD0.42)

Metrorrey also offered "Boletos Multiviaje" (multitrip tickets) until 2016. These tickets were intended for recurrent users and they are sold in denominations ranging from 15 to 85 trips.

Since the opening of the extension of the Line 2, Metrorrey began offering the "Mia" Card, a rechargeable card that can be loaded with multiple trip credits.  The "Mia" card can be initially purchased for MXN20 (~USD0.97) and can be recharged in increments ranging from MXN1 to MXN100. (~USD0.05 to ~USD4.83) Also, every MXN4, are added MXN0.50.

On May 16, 2009, Nuevo León governor Natividad González Parás announced that Metrorrey would be free for the following 60 days, as part of a program to reduce the effects of the economic downturn on citizens.

Rolling stock 

The Metrorrey system uses 134 high-floor articulated vehicles, used to form two- or three-car trainsets each, with the possibility of forming up to four-car trainsets. The MM-93 cars have an air-conditioning system. The first 25 cars were manufactured in 1990 by the Mexican government-owned Concarril (the National Railway Car Manufacturing Company) and the next 23 in 1992–93 by the Canadian company Bombardier, after it acquired Concarril in 1992, all 48 of these cars being built at a factory in Ciudad Sahagún, Mexico, and the two batches being "nearly identical". Those 48 cars were followed by 22 that were built in Spain by CAF, with the remaining 14 vehicles built by Bombardier. Specifically, Metrorrey ordered 25 two-section MM-90 cabs in 1988, and 23 MM-90/2F cabs in 1990 from Bombardier for Line 1; the latter type represents the second generation of the same vehicle equipped with high-tech components, including, among other things, asynchronous traction motors with the power supplied by catenary. The MM-93 cab, debuted during the opening of the Line 2, including full-closed windows, and an air-conditioning system, and following the expansion of Line 2, Metrorrey acquired 16 cabs based in an evolution of MM-90 / MM-90/2F cab.

In 2019, Metrorrey bought 24 former Frankfurt U-Bahn Type U3 trains, which were withdrawn from U-Bahn service in 2017, The trains were built by DUEWAG in 1979 and 1980, and underwent a refurbishment programme by Talbot Services to extend their service life by 20 years. The new fleet, purchased to operate on the upcoming Line 3 as well as to reduce headways on the existing system, includes also 26 newly manufactured CRRC Zhuzhou articulated cars.

In resume, the rolling stock is:

 25 Concarril MM-90A trains. Originally Built for Line 1. (#01 - #25)
 23 Bombardier MM-90B trains. Originally Built for Line 1. (#26 - #48)
 22 CAF MM-93 trains. Originally Built for Line 2. (#49 - #70)
 14 Bombardier MM-05 trains (basically modernized MM-90 trains) Originally Built for Line 2 expansion. (#71 - #84)
 26 CRRC MM-20 trains. Originally Built for Line 3. (#109 - #134)
 24 Talbot MM-80 trains (former Frankfurt U-Bahn Type U3 trains, refurbished between 2019 and 2020, and recalled MM-80) Built to reinforce L1 and L2 service. (#85 - #108)

Transmetro 

Metrorrey also has a bus system that uses exclusive and obligatory stops along its route.
It has nine lines. On Metrorrey Line 1 there are four Transmetro lines, three in Talleres station and one in Exposición station. On Line 2 there are five more Transmetro lines, two at San Nicolas (Santo Domingo and Las Puentes) and three more at Sendero (Montreal, Fomerrey, and Apodaca).
There is no additional fee, other than the standard Metro Ticket, to use Transmetro.

Future service 
Throughout his campaign and in the first months of his term, Governor Samuel García pledged to substantially expand the Metrorrey network during his tenure. In November 2021, García unveiled the planned routes for Lines 4 and 5.

García furthermore announced that the new lines will predominantly run on an elevated viaduct, which caused some backlash among neighbors in South Monterrey, with calls for an underground system. Line 6 was announced in the wake of this controversy.

Lines 4 and 5 will are expected to begin construction in July 2022, at a cost of MXN$19 billion (US$1 billion). The cost for Line 6 has been estimated at MXN$26 billion (US$1.3 billion), with a start date for its construction yet to be announced.

Network Map

See also
 List of metro systems
 List of Latin American rail transit systems by ridership
 Mexico City Metro
 Xochimilco Light Rail
 Guadalajara light rail system
 Ecovía

References

External links

Metrorrey – official website
Monterrey (Metrorrey) at UrbanRail.net
Siemens Receives Order to Extend the Metro in Monterrey, Mexico
The Tramways of Monterrey

 
Underground rapid transit in Mexico
Electric railways in Mexico
Railway lines opened in 1991
1991 establishments in Mexico